Treignac is a commune in the Corrèze department in central France. Treignac, designated one of the 'most beautiful villages of France', is a most typically French town retaining much of its medieval character, situated on the banks of the Vezere River on one of the pilgrimage routes to Santiago de Compostella, the burial place of St James the Apostle along the way known as the Via Lemovicensis and crosses the 13th-century bridge over the river. During the Hundred Years' War, it was pillaged by Rodrigo de Villandrando.

Geography

Location
Treignac is a commune located in the Massif Central on the Plateau de Millevaches. The village is built between 400 and 500 metres above sea level, at the foot of the Massif des Monédières, in the gorges of the Vézère river, at the gates of the Parc naturel régional de Millevaches en Limousin (Regional Natural Park of Millevaches in Limousin). The site is limited to the west by the Rocher des Folles and to the east by the Saut de la Virolle.

Hydrography
The waters of the Vézère are retained upstream of the village by the Barrage de Treignac (dam), forming the lac des Bariousses (lake). The commune is also watered by a tributary of the Vézère, the l'Alambre, and the stream called Ruisseau de la Cassière, tributary of the Soudaine, itself tributary of the Vézère.

Climate
Influenced by an Atlantic Oceanic climate, it gives rise to a very green natural vegetation.

History
Founded around 800 AD, its first Chateau or Castle was built around the year 1000 on an inaccessible rock outcrop on a loop of the Vezere and at the same time the city walls were commenced of which the Chabirande gate of the 13th century still survives although the ramparts were destroyed at the start of the 19th century. The Chateau was the stronghold of the lands of the Medieval dynasty the Vicomte de Comborn, who had as its first head the man known as Archambaud the butcher, as result of his cruel rule.

At Treignac, on the high point now called Les églises, not far from the fountain 
of Saint Méen, was the starting point of this settlement, the first houses were 
built around the churches of Saint-Martin, Saint-Léobon and Saint-Jean, now disappeared. The 
Church of Saint Martin was attached to the monastery at Uzerche. During the High Middle Ages, there were two main places in the current territory 
of the commune of Treignac: Manzannes and Treignac. In Manzannes, a priory 
was established, dedicated to the Notre Dame, attached to the monastery of 
Ventadour (Order of Cluny).

The current parish church is the Church of Our Lady built originally in the 13C in Romanesque style and formerly part of the Chateau it was originally known as  Notre-Dame-de-la-Basse-Cour and later Notre-Dame-des-Bans, when rebuilt in 1471. The bell tower was built in 1602 and one door in the style of Louis XIII (1610-1643) remains.

Treignac was a free city following three charters: 1205, 1284 and 1438. The city 
was governed by four consuls.

The Fleyssac house was built in the 15th century against the ramparts and buttresses of the gate of Pradelle, it was sold to the Protestants in 1638, where they celebrated their worship for the following 50 years.

The town has been sacked by armies more than once, most notably by Rodrigue de Villandrando during the Hundred Year War and later during the Wars of Religion in the 16th century.

Although rebuilding had started during the Renaissance much of the town dates from the 17th, 18th and 19th centuries whilst also preserving its medieval charm. The beautifully preserved Market hall in the town was originally built in the 12th century, it was rebuilt in the 15th century after being destroyed over a loan between warring factions. The Chapel of the Penitents (Notre Dame de la Paix) was built by the 'Brotherhood of White Penitents' as a reaction against the influx of Protestants in the 17th century.

Before the Revolution it was known as Treignac la Montagne but at the time of Convention or the French Revolutionary Government of 1792/95 it was renamed Treignac.

In more modern times the Finot bridge was built in 1824 and the Bargy bridge in 1840. In the 1900s, new streets were opened. On 20 July 1904, the PO-Corrèze railway line from Seihac to Treignac was built in 1904 but closed in 1970.

The economy of the region is in part supported by tourism.  As former Mayor, Guy Merle explained to Andre de Saint-Rat, kayaking contests and championships are popular.  On 27 May 2012 Thomas Chambard won a national kayaking championship here on the Vezere

Population

See also
Communes of the Corrèze department

References

Communes of Corrèze
Limousin
Corrèze communes articles needing translation from French Wikipedia